The Central Bank of Eswatini (Swazi: Umntsholi Wemaswati), is the central bank of Eswatini.  It was established in April 1974 and is based in capital Mbabane. According to the bank's website, the bank's mission is to promote monetary stability and foster a stable and sound financial system.
Among the bank's responsibilities are managing Eswatini's foreign exchange position and safeguarding the country's foreign reserves of cash.  The bank conducts weekly auctions of 91-day Swazi treasury bills, through "primary dealer" Swazi banks. The current governor is Dr. Phil Mnisi.

Governors
The governor of the bank is appointed by the King of Eswatini for a term of five years. 

Ethan Mayisela, April 1974 - June 1978
A. D. Ockenden, acting, June 1978 - June 1981
H. B. B. Oliver, July 1981 - June 1992
Martin Dlamini, acting, 1992
James Nxumalo, July 1992 - June 1997
Martin Dlamini, July 1997 - 2013
Majozi Sithole, 2013 - 2022
Dr. Phil Mnisi, 2022 - present

List of authorized banks of Eswatini
Eswatini Bank
Standard Bank Eswatini
First National Bank Swaziland
Nedbank Swaziland
Swaziland Building Society

See also

 Swazi lilangeni
 Economy of Eswatini
 List of finance ministers of Eswatini
 List of central banks of Africa
 List of central banks

References

External links

Eswatini
Mbabane
Banks of Eswatini
Banks established in 1974
1974 establishments in Swaziland